Kjos is a neighbourhood in the city of Kristiansand in Agder county, Norway. It is located in the Vågsbygd borough, south of Augland and east of Åsane.

References

Kristiansand
Neighbourhoods of Kristiansand